{{DISPLAYTITLE:C3H2O}}
The molecular formula C3H2O (molar mass: 54.05 g/mol, exact mass: 54.0106 u) may refer to:

 Cyclopropenone
 Propynal
 Propadienone